Kushchi may refer to:
Kechut, Armenia
Tasik, Armenia
Quşçu (disambiguation), several places in Azerbaijan